Harald Amundsen (born 30 November 1962) is a Norwegian sprint canoer who competed in the 1980s. He won two medals in the K-4 10000 m event at the ICF Canoe Sprint World Championships with a gold in 1987 and a silver in 1983.

Amundsen also competed in two Summer Olympics, earning his best finish of eighth in the K-2 1000 m event at Seoul in 1988.

His older brother, Steinar, won two Olympic medals in the K-4 1000 m event with a gold in 1968 and a bronze in 1972.

References

1962 births
Canoeists at the 1984 Summer Olympics
Canoeists at the 1988 Summer Olympics
Living people
Norwegian male canoeists
Olympic canoeists of Norway
ICF Canoe Sprint World Championships medalists in kayak